Grevillea evanescens is a species of flowering plant in the family Proteaceae and is endemic to the south-west of Western Australia. It is an erect to spreading shrub with oblong to elliptic leaves and clusters of pale to bright red and cream-coloured flowers.

Description
The upper surface of the leaves is more or less glabrous and the lower surface of young leaves is silky-hairy.

Taxonomy
Grevillea evanescens was first formally described in 1994 by Peter M. Olde and Neil R. Marriott in The Grevillea Book from specimens collected by Olde near Gingin in 1991. The specific epithet (evanescens) means "disappearing", referring to the hairs on the lower leaf surface.

Distribution and habitat
This grevillea grows in sandy soil in Banksia woodland near Gingin, in the Swan Coastal Plain biogeographic region of south-western Western Australia.

Conservation status
Grevillea evanescens is listed as "Priority One" by the Government of Western Australia Department of Biodiversity, Conservation and Attractions, meaning that it is known from only one or a few locations which are potentially at risk.

References

evanescens
Proteales of Australia
Flora of Western Australia
Plants described in 1994